Douglas Richard Hofstadter (born February 15, 1945) is an American scholar of cognitive science, physics, and comparative literature whose research includes concepts such as the sense of self in relation to the external world, consciousness, analogy-making, artistic creation, literary translation, and discovery in mathematics and physics. His 1979 book Gödel, Escher, Bach: An Eternal Golden Braid won both the Pulitzer Prize for general nonfiction and a National Book Award (at that time called The American Book Award) for Science. His 2007 book I Am a Strange Loop won the Los Angeles Times Book Prize for Science and Technology.

Early life and education 
Hofstadter was born in New York City to Jewish parents: Nobel Prize-winning physicist Robert Hofstadter and Nancy Givan Hofstadter. He grew up on the campus of Stanford University, where his father was a professor, and attended the International School of Geneva in 1958–59. He graduated with distinction in mathematics from Stanford University in 1965, and received his Ph.D. in physics from the University of Oregon in 1975, where his study of the energy levels of Bloch electrons in a magnetic field led to his discovery of the fractal known as Hofstadter's butterfly.

Academic career 
Since 1988, Hofstadter has been the College of Arts and Sciences Distinguished Professor of Cognitive Science and Comparative Literature at Indiana University in Bloomington, where he directs the Center for Research on Concepts and Cognition which consists of himself and his graduate students, forming the "Fluid Analogies Research Group" (FARG). He was initially appointed to the Indiana University's Computer Science Department faculty in 1977, and at that time he launched his research program in computer modeling of mental processes (which he called "artificial intelligence research", a label he has since dropped in favor of "cognitive science research"). In 1984, he moved to the University of Michigan in Ann Arbor, where he was hired as a professor of psychology and was also appointed to the Walgreen Chair for the Study of Human Understanding. In 1988 he returned to Bloomington as "College of Arts and Sciences Professor" in both cognitive science and computer science. He was also appointed adjunct professor of history and philosophy of science, philosophy, comparative literature, and psychology, but has said that his involvement with most of those departments is nominal. In 1988 Hofstadter received the In Praise of Reason award, the Committee for Skeptical Inquiry's highest honor. In April 2009 he was elected a Fellow of the American Academy of Arts and Sciences and a member of the American Philosophical Society. In 2010 he was elected a member of the Royal Society of Sciences in Uppsala, Sweden.

At the University of Michigan and Indiana University, he and Melanie Mitchell coauthored a computational model of "high-level perception"—Copycat—and several other models of analogy-making and cognition, including the Tabletop project, co-developed with Robert M. French. The Letter Spirit project, implemented by Gary McGraw and John Rehling, aims to model artistic creativity by designing stylistically uniform "gridfonts" (typefaces limited to a grid). Other more recent models include Phaeaco (implemented by Harry Foundalis) and SeqSee (Abhijit Mahabal), which model high-level perception and analogy-making in the microdomains of Bongard problems and number sequences, respectively, as well as George (Francisco Lara-Dammer), which models the processes of perception and discovery in triangle geometry.

Hofstadter has had several exhibitions of his artwork in various university galleries. These shows have featured large collections of his gridfonts, his ambigrams (pieces of calligraphy created with two readings, either of which is usually obtained from the other by rotating or reflecting the ambigram, but sometimes simply by "oscillation", like the Necker Cube or the rabbit/duck figure of Joseph Jastrow), and his "Whirly Art" (music-inspired visual patterns realized using shapes based on various alphabets from India). Hofstadter invented the term "ambigram" in 1984; many ambigrammists have since taken up the concept.

Hofstadter collects and studies cognitive errors (largely, but not solely, speech errors), "bon mots", and analogies of all sorts, and his longtime observation of these diverse products of cognition. His theories about the mechanisms that underlie them have exerted a powerful influence on the architectures of the computational models he and FARG members have developed.

Hofstadter's thesis about consciousness, first expressed in Gödel, Escher, Bach but also present in several of his later books, is that it is "an emergent consequence of seething lower-level activity in the brain". In Gödel, Escher, Bach he draws an analogy between the social organization of a colony of ants and the mind seen as a coherent "colony" of neurons. In particular, Hofstadter claims that our sense of having (or being) an "I" comes from the abstract pattern he terms a "strange loop", an abstract cousin of such concrete phenomena as audio and video feedback that Hofstadter has defined as "a level-crossing feedback loop". The prototypical example of a strange loop is the self-referential structure at the core of Gödel's incompleteness theorems. Hofstadter's 2007 book I Am a Strange Loop carries his vision of consciousness considerably further, including the idea that each human "I" is distributed over numerous brains, rather than being limited to one.
Le Ton beau de Marot: In Praise of the Music of Language is a long book devoted to language and translation, especially poetry translation, and one of its leitmotifs is a set of 88 translations of "Ma Mignonne", a highly constrained poem by 16th-century French poet Clément Marot. In this book, Hofstadter jokingly describes himself as "pilingual" (meaning that the sum total of the varying degrees of mastery of all the languages that he has studied comes to 3.14159 ...), as well as an "oligoglot" (someone who speaks "a few" languages).

In 1999, the bicentennial year of the Russian poet and writer Alexander Pushkin, Hofstadter published a verse translation of Pushkin's classic novel-in-verse Eugene Onegin. He has translated other poems and two novels: La Chamade (That Mad Ache) by Françoise Sagan, and La Scoperta dell'Alba (The Discovery of Dawn) by Walter Veltroni, the then-head of the Partito Democratico in Italy. The Discovery of Dawn was published in 2007, and That Mad Ache was published in 2009, bound together with Hofstadter's essay Translator, Trader: An Essay on the Pleasantly Pervasive Paradoxes of Translation.

Hofstadter's Law 

Hofstadter's Law is "It always takes longer than you expect, even when you take into account Hofstadter's Law." The law is stated in Gödel, Escher, Bach.

Students 
Hofstadter's former Ph.D. students include (with dissertation title):

David ChalmersToward a Theory of Consciousness
Bob FrenchTabletop: An Emergent, Stochastic Model of Analogy-Making
Gary McGrawLetter Spirit (Part One): Emergent High-level Perception of Letters Using Fluid Concepts
Melanie MitchellCopycat: A Computer Model of High-Level Perception and Conceptual Slippage in Analogy-making

Public image 

Hofstadter has said that he feels "uncomfortable with the nerd culture that centers on computers". He admits that "a large fraction [of his audience] seems to be those who are fascinated by technology", but when it was suggested that his work "has inspired many students to begin careers in computing and artificial intelligence" he replied that he was pleased about that, but that he himself has "no interest in computers". In that interview he also mentioned a course he has twice given at Indiana University, in which he took a "skeptical look at a number of highly touted AI projects and overall approaches". For example, upon the defeat of Garry Kasparov by Deep Blue, he commented that "It was a watershed event, but it doesn't have to do with computers becoming intelligent". In his book Metamagical Themas, he says that "in this day and age, how can anyone fascinated by creativity and beauty fail to see in computers the ultimate tool for exploring their essence?".

Provoked by predictions of a technological singularity (a hypothetical moment in the future of humanity when a self-reinforcing, runaway development of artificial intelligence causes a radical change in technology and culture), Hofstadter has both organized and participated in several public discussions of the topic. At Indiana University in 1999 he organized such a symposium, and in April 2000, he organized a larger symposium titled "Spiritual Robots" at Stanford University, in which he moderated a panel consisting of Ray Kurzweil, Hans Moravec, Kevin Kelly, Ralph Merkle, Bill Joy, Frank Drake, John Holland and John Koza. Hofstadter was also an invited panelist at the first Singularity Summit, held at Stanford in May 2006. Hofstadter expressed doubt that the singularity will occur in the foreseeable future.

In 1988 Dutch director Piet Hoenderdos created a docudrama about Hofstadter and his ideas, Victim of the Brain, based on The Mind's I. It includes interviews with Hofstadter about his work.

Columnist 
When Martin Gardner retired from writing his "Mathematical Games" column for Scientific American magazine, Hofstadter succeeded him in 1981–83 with a column titled Metamagical Themas (an anagram of "Mathematical Games"). An idea he introduced in one of these columns was the concept of "Reviews of This Book", a book containing nothing but cross-referenced reviews of itself that has an online implementation. One of Hofstadter's columns in Scientific American concerned the damaging effects of sexist language, and two chapters of his book Metamagical Themas are devoted to that topic, one of which is a biting analogy-based satire, "A Person Paper on Purity in Language" (1985), in which the reader's presumed revulsion at racism and racist language is used as a lever to motivate an analogous revulsion at sexism and sexist language; Hofstadter published it under the pseudonym William Satire, an allusion to William Safire. Another column reported on the discoveries made by University of Michigan professor Robert Axelrod in his computer tournament pitting many iterated prisoner's dilemma strategies against each other, and a follow-up column discussed a similar tournament that Hofstadter and his graduate student Marek Lugowski organized. The "Metamagical Themas" columns ranged over many themes, including patterns in Frédéric Chopin's piano music (particularly his études), the concept of superrationality (choosing to cooperate when the other party/adversary is assumed to be equally intelligent as oneself), and the self-modifying game of Nomic, based on the way the legal system modifies itself, and developed by philosopher Peter Suber.

Personal life 
Hofstadter was married to Carol Ann Brush until her death. They met in Bloomington, and married in Ann Arbor in 1985. They had two children, Danny and Monica. Carol died in 1993 from the sudden onset of a brain tumor, glioblastoma multiforme, when their children were 5 and 2. The Carol Ann Brush Hofstadter Memorial Scholarship for Bologna-bound Indiana University students was established in 1996 in her name. Hofstadter's book Le Ton beau de Marot is dedicated to their two children and its dedication reads "To M. & D., living sparks of their Mommy's soul".

In 2010, Hofstadter met Baofen Lin in a cha-cha-cha class, and they married in Bloomington in September 2012.

Hofstadter has composed  pieces for piano and for piano and voice. He created an audio CD, DRH/JJ, which includes all these compositions performed mostly by pianist Jane Jackson, with a few performed by Brian Jones, Dafna Barenboim, Gitanjali Mathur and Hofstadter.

The dedication for I Am A Strange Loop is: "To my sister Laura, who can understand, and to our sister Molly, who cannot." Hofstadter explains in the preface that his younger sister Molly never developed the ability to speak or understand language.

As a consequence of his attitudes about consciousness and empathy, Hofstadter became vegan in his teenage years, and has remained primarily a vegetarian since that time.

In popular culture
In the 1982 novel 2010: Odyssey Two, Arthur C. Clarke's first sequel to 2001: A Space Odyssey, HAL 9000 is described by the character "Dr. Chandra" as being caught in a "Hofstadter–Möbius loop". The movie uses the term "H. Möbius loop".

On April 3, 1995, Hofstadter's book Fluid Concepts and Creative Analogies: Computer Models of the Fundamental Mechanisms of Thought was the first book sold by Amazon.com.

Published works

Books 
The books published by Hofstadter are (the ISBNs refer to paperback editions, where available):
Gödel, Escher, Bach: an Eternal Golden Braid (1979)
Metamagical Themas (collection of Scientific American columns and other essays, all with postscripts)
Ambigrammi: un microcosmo ideale per lo studio della creatività (in Italian only)
Fluid Concepts and Creative Analogies (co-authored with several of Hofstadter's graduate students)
Rhapsody on a Theme by Clement Marot (1995, published 1996; volume 16 of series The Grace A. Tanner Lecture in Human Values)
Le Ton beau de Marot: In Praise of the Music of Language
I Am a Strange Loop (2007)
Surfaces and Essences: Analogy as the Fuel and Fire of Thinking, co-authored with Emmanuel Sander (first published in French as L'Analogie. Cœur de la pensée; published in English in the U.S. in April 2013)

Papers 
Hofstadter has written, among many others, the following papers:

"Energy levels and wave functions of Bloch electrons in rational and irrational magnetic fields", Phys. Rev. B 14 (1976) 2239.
"A non-deterministic approach to analogy, involving the Ising model of ferromagnetism", in Eduardo Caianiello (ed.), The Physics of Cognitive Processes. Teaneck, NJ: World Scientific, 1987.
"To Err is Human; To Study Error-making is Cognitive Science" (co-authored by David J. Moser), Michigan Quarterly Review, Vol. XXVIII, No. 2, 1989, pp. 185–215.
"Speechstuff and thoughtstuff: Musings on the resonances created by words and phrases via the subliminal perception of their buried parts", in Sture Allen (ed.), Of Thoughts and Words: The Relation between Language and Mind. Proceedings of the Nobel Symposium 92, London/New Jersey: World Scientific Publ., 1995, 217–267.
"On seeing A's and seeing As", Stanford Humanities Review Vol. 4, No. 2 (1995) pp. 109–121.
 "Analogy as the Core of Cognition", in Dedre Gentner, Keith Holyoak, and Boicho Kokinov (eds.) The Analogical Mind: Perspectives from Cognitive Science, Cambridge, MA: The MIT Press/Bradford Book, 2001, pp. 499–538.

Hofstadter has also written over 50 papers that were published through the Center for Research on Concepts and Cognition.

Involvement in other books 
Hofstadter has written forewords for or edited the following books:
The Mind's I: Fantasies and Reflections on Self and Soul (co-edited with Daniel Dennett), 1981. and 
Alan Turing: The Enigma by Andrew Hodges, 1983. (Preface)
Sparse Distributed Memory by Pentti Kanerva, Bradford Books/MIT Press, 1988. (Foreword)
Are Quanta Real? A Galilean Dialogue by J.M. Jauch, Indiana University Press, 1989. (Foreword)
Gödel's Proof (2002 revised edition) by Ernest Nagel and James R. Newman, edited by Hofstadter. In the foreword, Hofstadter explains that the book (originally published in 1958) exerted a profound influence on him when he was young.
Who Invented the Computer? The Legal Battle That Changed Computing History by Alice Rowe Burks, 2003. (Foreword)
Alan Turing: Life and Legacy of a Great Thinker by Christof Teuscher, 2003. (editor)
Brainstem Still Life by Jason Salavon, 2004. (Introduction)
Masters of Deception: Escher, Dalí & the Artists of Optical Illusion by Al Seckel, 2004. (Foreword)
King of Infinite Space: Donald Coxeter, the Man Who Saved Geometry by Siobhan Roberts, Walker and Company, 2006. (Foreword)
Exact Thinking in Demented Times: The Vienna Circle and the Epic Quest for the Foundations of Science by Karl Sigmund, Basic Books, 2017. Hofstadter wrote the foreword and helped with the translation.

Translations
Eugene Onegin: A Novel Versification from the Russian original of Alexander Pushkin), 1999.
The Discovery of Dawn from the Italian original of Walter Veltroni, 2007.
That Mad Ache, co-bound with Translator, Trader: An Essay on the Pleasantly Pervasive Paradoxes of Translation from the French original of Francoise Sagan), 2009.

See also 

 American philosophy
 BlooP and FlooP
 Egbert B. Gebstadter
 Hofstadter points
 Hofstadter's butterfly
 Hofstadter's law
 List of American philosophers
 Meta
 Platonia dilemma
 Superrationality

Notes

References

External links 

 Stanford University Presidential Lecture – site dedicated to Hofstadter and his work
 
 "The Man Who Would Teach Machines to Think" by James Somers, The Atlantic, November 2013 issue
 Profile at Resonance Publications
 NF Reviews – bibliographic page with reviews of several of Hofstadter's books
 "Autoportrait with Constraint" – a short autobiography in the form of a lipogram
 Github repo of sourcecode & literature of Hofstadter's students work
 Douglas Hofstadter on the Literature Map

1945 births
Living people
20th-century American writers
20th-century American philosophers
21st-century American poets
21st-century American philosophers
21st-century translators
American people of Polish-Jewish descent
American science writers
Mathematics popularizers
American skeptics
Fellows of the American Academy of Arts and Sciences
Indiana University faculty
National Book Award winners
Palo Alto High School alumni
People from Palo Alto, California
Philosophers of mind
Jewish philosophers
Jewish American writers
Pulitzer Prize for General Non-Fiction winners
Recreational mathematicians
Stanford University alumni
Translators of Alexander Pushkin
University of Michigan faculty
University of Oregon alumni
Fellows of the Cognitive Science Society
Center for Advanced Study in the Behavioral Sciences fellows
21st-century American non-fiction writers
International School of Geneva alumni